This list contains all radio stations that have been broadcasting on the FM or AM band in Hungary or are members of the Hungarian Federation of Free Radios. These stations are variously called community, small community, or free radios. Their licence have been termed "non-profit" or "public program provider" before the 2010 media law that introduced the terms "small community" and "community" media services, the latter also including commercial stations with public service type programming. Commercial (for-profit) operations are not included in this list.

Additional networks and stations operate with "community" licence that include news, public affairs, music stations, religious regional and semi-national networks and local commercial stations.

The number of small community radio stations in Hungary 

*Small Community licensed stations

Further reading 

 Hargitai H: The state of the Community Radio sector in Hungary 2010-2014, Szabad Rádiók Magyarországi Szervezete, 2014
 Hargitai Henrik, Szombathy Csaba, Mayer GH: Radio landscape in Hungary, In: John, Allen Hendricks (szerk.) The Palgrave Handbook of Global Radio, Palgrave Macmillan (2012) pp. 209-231., 2012
 Hargitai H, Ferenczi T: Kisközösségi rádiók 2010, In: Walter, A (szerk.) Kisközösségi rádiózás a hazai gyakorlatban 2010, Szabad Rádiók Magyarországi Szervezete (2010) pp. 10-51., 2010 
 Hargitai Henrik: Kisközösségi rádiósok kézikönyve., Szabad Rádiók Magyarországi Szervezete, 2004 
 Gosztonyi, Gergely 2009 Past, Present and Future of the Hungarian Community Radio Movement, p. 297-308., 2009, In: Howley, Kevin (ed.): Understanding community media, SAGE Publications Ltd. 

 Gosztonyi, Gergely  2006 The history of community broadcasting in Hungary, 2006, In: Relating Radio. Communities. Aesthetics. Access. Golo Föllmer & Sven Thiermann (eds.), Spector Books, Leipzig. 
 Gosztonyi, Gergely  2006 Models for intercultural organisation and communication in community media (társszerző és társszerkesztő, Flechtker, Beate, Isphording, Angela, Galiana, Sally) p. 17-47., 2006, In: Intercultural Media Training in Europe, Kopaed Verlags GmbH, München
Velics Gabriella. The changing situation of Hungarian community radio. (2012) In:  Community radio in the twenty-first century pp. 265-281

References 

Radio in Hungary
Hungary
Lists of mass media in Hungary
community radio stations in Hungary